Stina Agnes Elisabeth Rautelin (born 25 October 1963 in Helsinki) is a Finland-Swede actor, working in Sweden. She is best known for the role as Lena Klingström in the films about Martin Beck. She speaks Swedish and Finnish.

Selected filmography
Beck – Levande begravd (2010)
Beck – I Guds namn (2007)
Beck – Det tysta skriket (2007)
Beck – Den svaga länken (2007)
Beck – Advokaten (2007)
Beck – Gamen (2006)
Beck – Flickan i jordkällaren (2006)
Tjocktjuven (2006)
Tomten är far till alla barnen (1999)
 1998 – Rederiet
Beck – Spår i mörker (1998)
Beck – The Money Man (1998)
Beck – Monstret (1998)
Beck – Pensionat Pärlan (1998)
Beck – Öga för öga (1998)
Beck – Vita nätter (1998)
Beck – Mannen med ikonerna (1997)
Beck – Lockpojken (1997)
På liv och död (1996)
 1995 – Radioskugga

References

External links

Swedish actresses
Finnish actresses
1963 births
Swedish-speaking Finns
Living people
Finnish expatriates in Sweden